Onesidezero (also depicted as OneSideZero) is an American rock band. Their style is often described as heavy melodic rock. Their songs are often very dark, with deep lyrics and slow bass lines.

History 
Formed in 1997, the band recorded several demos before being signed by Maverick Records. Their first full-length album, Is This Room Getting Smaller, was released on November 20, 2001. The band toured for three years, alongside bands like Incubus, 311, Sevendust, Static-X, Soulfly, and SOiL. They also appeared on HBO's Reverb with Linkin Park. The singles "Instead Laugh" and "New World Order" failed to push the album, and the band asked to be released from their contract. In 2003, Onesidezero disbanded and retreated to various side projects.

The most notable side project, Abloom (previously called Mothra), featured vocalist Jasan Radford and lead guitarist Levon Sultanian. Also part of the band was Mike Doling (ex-Snot, ex-Soulfly), Roy Mayorga (ex-Soulfly) and John Fahnestock (ex-Snot). Fahnestock left and was replaced by Marcelo Dias aka Marcello D. Rapp (ex-Soulfly). Shavo Odadjian of System of a Down took the role of executive producer.

Abloom song titles included "Cover Up", "After That Quiet", "January 2nd", "What You Came For", "Shadows", and "Mama Don't Cry". Some of these are featured on their MySpace page while others appear elsewhere on the internet. Abloom has a more classic rock feel while at times showcasing Levon Sultanian's guitar playing who is of Armenian descent.

In late 2004, Onesidezero reunited and worked on new material. The band toured throughout 2005 and 2006 while writing and recording their album with Ulrich Wild (Taproot, Static-X) at the helm. Before writing what would become their self-titled 2007 release, the band wrote, and scrapped, almost an album and a half worth of material that comprised most of their setlist from 2002 through 2006. Song titles included "Empty", "Summertime", "Quicksand", "Chasing the Sun", "Say", "Separate", "Up From Down", "U4IA", "Oneside of the Zero", and more. On November 8, 2006, Onesidezero announced they had signed with Corporate Punishment Records. Their self-titled album Onesidezero was released June 5, 2007. It was originally slated for a February 20 release. According to their Facebook page, they are in the process of writing new music for their next album for 2012 release.

Music 
Writing about the band's music for LA Weekly, Paul Rogers wrote, "Onesidezero sounded like Tool without the polyrhythmic prog-iness and deliberate mystique, and offered all the angst of nu-metal sans the knuckle-dragging mob mentality. This was thoughtful, intelligent hard rock".

Band members 
Current
 Jasan Radford — vocals, guitar
 Levon Sultanian — Lead guitar, backing vocals(1997–2003, 2004–2007, 2010–present)
 Brett Kane — guitar, backing vocals (1998–2003, 2007–present)
 Cristian Hernandez — bass, backing vocals
 Rob Basile — drums

Former members
 Travis Prentice — drums, backing vocals (1997–1999,)
 Peter Pres — bass guitar, backing vocals (1997–1999,)
 Colin Crow — guitar (2007–2009)

Discography

Studio albums 
Is This Room Getting Smaller (2001)
Onesidezero (2007)

Demos 
 1998 –
Paste
Brocwurst
Sleep Through This
Into A Million Pieces

 2000 –
Instead Laugh
Holding Cell
New World Order
Shed the Skin
Eight
Sleep Through This

 2003 – Summer Demo
Empty
Separate
Summertime

 2003 – 2/5's Demo (contains some alternate versions)
Empty
Summertime
Quicksand
Chasing the Sun

Singles 

Drummer Rob Basile contributed drums for singer-songwriter Colleen Grace on albums Colleen Grace (2003) and Rosetta Hotel (2006), and for the track entitled "Where He Can Hide" by Tom Wolfe on the soundtrack of the film Me, Myself & Irene starring Jim Carrey (2000).

Vocalist Jasan Radford contributed vocals to the tracks "Run Around," "Going Digital," and "Strange" on the soundtrack of Digimon: The Movie, as well as the theme song for Power Rangers Time Force.

The song "Tapwater" from Is This Room Getting Smaller was featured in the film A Walk to Remember.

Music videos

References

External links 
 Abloom at MySpace

American hard rock musical groups
Musical groups established in 1997
Musical groups from Los Angeles
Corporate Punishment Records artists